The Montérolier-Buchy–Saint-Saëns railway is a standard gauge branch line that operated between 1900 and 1953 in the département of Seine-Maritime, France. The line ran  in a roughly north-northwesterly direction, beginning in Montérolier-Buchy station (which is located in the commune of Montérolier and is a part of the Amiens–Rouen railway) and terminating in the small town of Saint-Saëns. The line passed through the town of Saint-Martin-Osmonville and over the Pont-du-Thil. It was administered on behalf of the département by the Compagnie des chemins de fer du Nord. The line is a cul-de-sac.

History

Planning
When the Amiens-Rouen railway was commissioned on April 8, 1867 by the Compagnie des chemins de fer du Nord, the town of Saint-Saëns was excluded from its route. This lack of access affected the local economy, particularly in the manufacturing sector, with the industries of cotton spinning and leather tanning suffering from import and export of both raw materials and produce.

Construction

After the survey for the planning of the route was completed on April 16, 1896, the town council made a decision on the route of the proposed branch line, and opted for the most direct route, bypassing the intervening communes of Montérolier, Neufbosc, Mathonville, and Bradiancourt. This route, which extended  further east to meet the demands of the town council, met with the opposition of the railway company operating the Amiens-Roun line. However, a deal was agreed upon and the company agreed to begin work on the construction of the line.

The town of Saint-Saëns, wishing to hasten the construction and associate itself with the building of the line, decided on May 18, 1897 to provide the sum of 60,000 francs towards the construction of the line. However, the sum was only enough for the construction of a station. The work was carried out expeditiously, although there were two fatalities in December 1899. The line was commissioned on schedule and opened on October 14, 1900.

Closure
After World War II, the line was no longer profitable, and it closed on January 1, 1953.

References

Railway lines in Normandy